Parthian Books is an independent publisher based in Cardigan, Wales.  It was founded in 1993 by Lewis Davies and Gillian Griffiths. An editorially-led publishing house, Parthian publishes a range of contemporary fiction, poetry, non-fiction and drama, as well as art books. It is also involved in the European literary scene. Parthian's motto is "A Carnival of Voices in Independent Publishing".

Some of the authors that Parthian Books has published include Richard Owain Roberts, Alys Conran, Peter Lord, Rebecca F John, Tristan Hughes, Deborah Kay Davies, Professor Dai Smith, Rachel Trezise, Susmita Bhattacharya, Lewis Davies, Glen Peters and Jeni Williams. Parthian also publishes celebrity autobiographies, such as Griff Rhys Jones' Insufficiently Welsh, and Boyd Clack's Kisses Sweeter Than Wine.

Lewis Davies is a performed dramatist. Parthian Books has published books on the history of theatre in Wales by Hazel Walford Davies,  Angela V John and Daryl Leeworthy.

Parthian receives financial support from the Welsh Books Council in the form of grants,. The company is  also responsible for publishing the Library of Wales series,  a Welsh Assembly Government and Welsh Books Council joint initiative.

An exhibition to mark the company's thirty years was held at the museum at St Dogmaels Abbey, Pembrokeshire in January-February 2023.

Translation 
Parthian Books works in partnership with Il Caduceo literary agency in Genoa who represents their writers in translation. Parthian has developed translation links throughout Europe and beyond, and its books have appeared in fifteen foreign language editions including French, Italian, Spanish, Arabic, Turkish, Danish, Portuguese and Russian. Parthian has also recently announced its first book deal with New Star publications in China for the thriller The Colour of a Dog Running Away by Richard Gwyn.

As with his debut short fiction collection, All The Places We Lived, The Serbian language rights for Richard Owain Roberts' debut novel, The Guardian's Not The Booker prize winning Hello Friend We Missed You, have been acquired by Partizanska Knjiga, the first time Parthian Books have sold foreign translation rights ahead of English language publication. According to the publishing editor, "Roberts follows Jarett Kobek, Ben Lerner and Miranda July as the latest English-language novelist to have his work translated into Serbian."

Parthian also publishes titles translated into English, such as To Bury the Dead, Under the Dust, The Bridge Over the River, Strange Language, Martha, Jac and Shanco from Basque, Catalan, German, Spanish and Welsh. In 2015, the publisher launched the Europa Carnivale series, with the intention of releasing translations of works originally published in German, Polish, Slovak, Spanish and Turkish.

In 2016, Parthian was awarded money by the India Wales Fund for a collaborative literature project called The Valley, The City, The Village. The project will see the publication in 2018 of a writing anthology curated by three Welsh writers and three Indian writers. In early 2017, the three Welsh writers visited India to engage with the culture and take part in writing and reading events. In spring 2017, the three Indian authors will visit Wales. The project is being run in collaboration with Bee Books, an English publisher in Kolkata, India. The writers will blog about their experiences, and make use of them for the anthology.

Awards 

Since its foundation in 1993, Parthian and its titles have regularly received recognition through award nominations. Welsh Boys Too, a collection of short stories by John Sam Jones, was named as a 'Stonewall Honor Book in Literature' in 2002, and in 2003 Lewis Davies' Work, Sex and Rugby picked up the World Book Day Award for Wales. The Long Dry, the debut novel from Cynan Jones, won the Betty Trask Award in 2007.

In 2020, Richard Owain Roberts won The Guardian's Not The Booker Prize for his debut novel Hello Friend We Missed You. The competition judge, Sam Jordison, described it as "the gem of the shortlist" and as "formally daring, very funny, a writer of real talent and potential."

In 2006, Parthian author Rachel Trezise became the first recipient of the Dylan Thomas Prize for her short story collection Fresh Apples. Following this success in the inaugural award, two further Parthian titles have been nominated for the £30,000 prize: Jemma L. King's poetry collection The Shape of a Forest in 2013 and Alys Conran's novel Pigeon in 2017.

Parthian has also enjoyed success in the Wales Book of the Year, an award given annually to the best Welsh and English language works by Welsh or Welsh interest authors. Deborah Kay Davies gave the publisher its first win in 2009 with her short story collection Grace, Tamar and Laszlo the Beautiful. Further wins followed in 2011 (with John Harrison's Cloud Road) and in 2017 (with Alys Conran's Pigeon). Parthian's record of three Wales Book of the Year awards is matched by Faber, and only bettered by Seren.

Many award-winning individual short stories and poems have later been included in Parthian collections. Most notably, these include 'Mr. Roopratna's Chocolate' from Lewis Davies' Love and Other Possibilities, which won the Rhys Davies Prize in 1999, and 'Moon Dog' from Rebecca F John's Clown's Shoes, which won the PEN International New Voices Award in 2015. Since 2012, Parthian has published Cheval: the annual Terry Hetherington Award anthology. Many of the winners of this award, including Mari Ellis Dunning, Natalie Ann Holborow, Jemma L. King and Joâo Morais, have later released their debut publications with Parthian.

Imprints and series

Bright Young Things
In 2010, Parthian launched the Bright Young Things series, with the intention of helping young writers into print. The first four writers published were Tyler Keevil, Will Gritten, J. P. Smythe and Susie Wild. A poetry anthology, 10 of the Best, followed in 2011, featuring ten poems each from Mab Jones, Alan Kellermann, Anna Lewis, M. A. Oliver-Semenov and Siôn Tomos Owen. Full poetry collections from Kellermann and Lewis were published under the Bright Young Things banner in 2012, though the series marketing was less prominent. Collections from Oliver-Semenov and Owen were published by Parthian in 2016, but by this point the Bright Young Things series had been seemingly abandoned.

Europa Carnivale
The Europa Carnivale series is a collection of fiction and poetry from contemporary European women writers. The series began with a translation of Goldfish Memory by Swiss writer Monique Schwitter in 2015. Other writers in the series include Alys Conran, Emilia Ivancu, Rebecca F. John, Uršuľa Kovalyk and Ece Temelkuran. The titles released in the series so far have picked up a number of prestigious awards, among them the PEN International New Voices Award and the Wales Book of the Year.

Library of Wales

The Library of Wales series is a project intending to revive and preserve classic Welsh titles. Titles published so far are:
A Kingdom, James Hanley
A Man's Estate, Emyr Humphreys
A Rope of Vines, Brenda Chamberlain
A Time to Laugh, Rhys Davies
All Things Betray Thee, Gwyn Thomas
The Alone to the Alone, Gwyn Thomas
Ash on a Young Man's Sleeve, Dannie Abse
The Autobiography of a Super-Tramp, W. H. Davies
The Battle to the Weak, Hilda Vaughan
Black Parade, Jack Jones
Border Country, Raymond Williams
Carwyn, Alun Richards
The Caves of Alienation, Stuart Evans
Congratulate the Devil, Howell Davies
Country Dance, Margiad Evans
Cwmardy, Lewis Jones
Dai Country, Alun Richards
Dat's Love and Other Stories, Leonora Brito
The Dark Philosophers, Gwyn Thomas
Farewell Innocence, William Glynne-Jones
Feet in Chains, Kate Roberts
Flame and Slag, Ron Berry
Goodbye, Twentieth Century, Dannie Abse
The Great God Pan, Arthur Machen
The Heyday in the Blood, Geraint Goodwin
The Hill of Dreams, Arthur Machen
Home to an Empty House, Alun Richards
I Sent a Letter to My Love, Bernice Rubens
In the Green Tree, Alun Lewis
Jampot Smith, Jeremy Brooks
The Long Revolution, Raymond Williams
Make Room for the Jester, Stead Jones
Mapping the Territory, Katie Gramich (ed.)
Old Soldier Sahib, Frank Richards
Old Soldiers Never Die, Frank Richards
Poetry 1900–2000, Meic Stephens (ed.)
Rhapsody, Dorothy Edwards
Ride the White Stallion, William Glynne-Jones
So Long, Hector Bebb, Ron Berry
Sport, Gareth Williams (ed.)
Story: The Library of Wales Short Story Anthology Volume I, Dai Smith
Story: The Library of Wales Short Story Anthology Volume II, Dai Smith
Turf or Stone, Margiad Evans
The Valley, The City, The Village, Glyn Jones
Voices of the Children, George Ewart Evans
The Volunteers, Raymond Williams
The Water-castle, Brenda Chamberlain
We Live, Lewis Jones
The Withered Root, Rhys Davies
Young Emma, W.H. Davies

Parthian Baltic
To coincide with the Baltic market focus at the 2018 London Book Fair, Parthian launched the Parthian Baltic series. The series includes translations of works by writers from Latvia, Lithuania and Estonia, among them Alberts Bels, Eeva Park and Krišjānis Zeļģis.

References

External links 
 Parthian
 Library of Wales series

Publishing companies of Wales
1993 establishments in Wales
Publishing companies established in 1993
Companies based in Ceredigion